Taboe (Dutch for Taboo) is a Flemish television show in which Philippe Geubels explores humor and topics that tend to be taboo in comedy, including physical limitations, terminal illnesses, skin color and poverty.

In December 2018, the show won the Ha! award for best television show, an annual award by HUMO magazine.

In 2019, the show received a nomination for an International Emmy Award in the category Non-Scripted Entertainment. The show did not win the Emmy Award; the British show The Real Full Monty: Ladies' Night won the award instead.

Concept 
Every episode Philippe Geubels invites around four people in his holiday home. People with a physical disability, people suffering from an incurable disease, LGBTs and so on. In short, people whom you wouldn't laugh at. He visits the area with them and listens to everyone's story. Meanwhile, he brings a stand-up comedy about the theme of the evening, the audience is composed of people similar to the guests.

Seasons

Season 1

Season 2

References 

2018 Belgian television series debuts
Flemish television shows
Eén original programming